The 1999 Davis Cup (also known as the 1999 Davis Cup by NEC for sponsorship purposes) was the 88th edition of the Davis Cup, the most important tournament between national teams in men's tennis. 129 teams entered the competition, 16 in the World Group, 30 in the Americas Zone, 32 in the Asia/Oceania Zone, and 51 in the Europe/Africa Zone. Fiji made its first appearances in the tournament.

Australia defeated France in the final, held at the Acropolis Exhibition Hall in Nice, France, on 3–5 December, to win their 27th title and their first since 1986. Mark Philippoussis, Lleyton Hewitt and doubles pairing Todd Woodbridge and Mark Woodforde made up the winning Australian team in the final; Pat Rafter, who was involved in the Aussies' run to the final was forced to pull out due to injury.

World Group

Draw

Final
France vs. Australia

World Group Qualifying Round

Date: 24–26 September

The eight losing teams in the World Group first round ties and eight winners of the Zonal Group I final round ties competed in the World Group Qualifying Round for spots in the 2000 World Group.

  are promoted to the World Group in 2000.
  are relegated to Zonal Group I in 2000.

Americas Zone

Group I

Group II

Group III
 Venue: Fredo Maduro Centre, Panama City, Panama
 Date: 3–7 May

Final standings

  and  promoted to Group II in 2000.
  and  relegated to Group IV in 2000.

Group IV
 Venue: Hasely Crawford Stadium, Port of Spain, Trinidad and Tobago
 Date: 8–14 March

Final standings

  and  promoted to Group III in 1999.

Asia/Oceania Zone

Group I

Group II

Group III
 Venue: National Centre, Dhaka, Bangladesh
 Date: 10–14 March

Final standings

  and  promoted to Group II in 2000.
  and  relegated to Group IV in 2000.

Group IV
 Venue: National Centre, Bandar Seri Begawan, Brunei
 Date: 3–7 February

Final standings

  and  promoted to Group III in 2000.

Europe/Africa Zone

Group I

Group II

Group III

Zone A
 Venue: Gezira Sporting Club, Cairo, Egypt
 Date: 24–28 February

Final standings

  and  promoted to Group II in 2000.
  and  relegated to Group IV in 2000.

Zone B
 Venue: Sini-Valge Tennis Club, Tallinn, Estonia
 Date: 9–13 June

Final standings

  and  promoted to Group II in 2000.
  and  relegated to Group IV in 2000.

Group IV
 Venue: Lugogo Tennis Club, Kampala, Uganda
 Date: 28 January–1 February

Zone A
Final standings

  and  promoted to Group III in 2000.

Zone B
Final standings

  and  promoted to Group III in 2000.

References
General

Specific

External links
Davis Cup official website

 
Davis Cups by year
Davis Cup
Davis Cup